Plenishnik is a rural locality (a village) in Yagnitskoye Rural Settlement, Cherepovetsky District, Vologda Oblast, Russia. The population was 125 as of 2002. There are 8 streets.

Geography 
Myshkino is the nearest rural locality.

References 

Rural localities in Cherepovetsky District